"You Win My Love" is a song recorded by Canadian country music singer Shania Twain. It was released in January 1996 as the fifth single from her second studio album The Woman in Me (1995). The song was written single-handedly by Robert John "Mutt" Lange, making it one of her few singles that Twain did not co-write. The song became Twain's third No. 1 hit at country radio, and like the previous single "(If You're Not in It for Love) I'm Outta Here!", a new remix was done by Lange for pop and international promotion. It spent two weeks at the top of the Billboard Hot Country Songs chart in May 1996, before taking a considerably large drop to No. 11. It was originally released to radio in early 1996, the song was also released as a single in Australia.

Music video
The music video for "You Win My Love" was shot in Orlando, Florida and directed by Steven Goldmann. It was filmed on January 14 and 15, 1996 and debuted on CMT on January 27 of that same year. The video is set at a race track where Twain drives around in a race car in a skin-tight leather outfit, and is based on the lyrics to the song which are vehicle-related. Two versions of the video were released, one with the 'Album Version' and one with the 'Mutt Lange Mix'. The 'Mutt Lange Mix' version is available on Twain's DVD The Platinum Collection, while the 'Album Version' is available on YouTube.

Chart performance
"You Win My Love" debuted on the Billboard Hot Country Singles & Tracks chart the week of February 24, 1996 at number 47. This was the highest debut of the week as well as her highest debut at the time, a record previously held by "The Woman in Me", when it entered the chart at number 65. "You Win My Love" spent 20 weeks on the chart and climbed to a peak position of number one on May 4, 1996, where it remained for two weeks. The single became Twain's third number-one single, third Top 10 single, and fifth consecutive Top 20 single. "You Win My Love" was tied with "Any Man of Mine" for fastest climb to the top at eleven weeks, as well as both "Any Man of Mine" and "I'm Outta Here!" for most weeks at number-one, at two. The song reached number two on the Hot Country Singles Sales chart.

"You Win My Love" remains the last song to have fallen from number one out of the Top 10 on Hot Country Songs.  It plummeted 1-11 on the chart dated May 18, 1996.

Official versions
Album Version (4:26)
Radio Edit (3:45)
Mutt Lange Mix (4:40)
Mutt Lange Mix Edit (3:54)
Still the One: Live from Vegas version (4:33)

Track listings

US CD & Cassette Single
"You Win My Love" — 4:26
"Home Ain't Where His Heart Is (Anymore)" — 4:12

Australian CD Single
"You Win My Love" (Mutt Lange Mix) — 3:57
"You Win My Love" (Album Version) — 4:26
"If It Don't Take Two" — 3:40

Australian CD & Cassette Single
"You Win My Love" (Mutt Lange Mix) — 3:57
"You Win My Love" (Album Version) — 4:26
"If It Don't Take Two" — 3:40
"(If You're Not In It For Love) I'm Outta Here!" — 4:27

Charts

Weekly charts

Year-end charts

Notes

1996 singles
Shania Twain songs
Songs written by Robert John "Mutt" Lange
Song recordings produced by Robert John "Mutt" Lange
Mercury Records singles
Mercury Nashville singles
Music videos directed by Steven Goldmann
1995 songs